Guillermo Daniel Ortega Reyes is a politician from Nicaragua who is serving as President of the Central American Parliament from 28 October 2021.

References 

Nicaraguan politicians
Presidents of Central American Parliament
Year of birth missing (living people)
Living people